The 2010 Bank of America 500 was a NASCAR Sprint Cup Series stock car race held on October 16, 2010, at Charlotte Motor Speedway in Concord, North Carolina. Contested over 334 laps, it was the thirty-first race during the 2010 NASCAR Sprint Cup Series season, and the fifth race in the season-ending Chase for the Sprint Cup. The race was won by Jamie McMurray, for the Earnhardt Ganassi Racing team. Kyle Busch finished second, and Jimmie Johnson, who started tenth, clinched third.

Pole position driver Jeff Gordon maintained his lead on the first lap to begin the race, as Carl Edwards, who started in the second position on the grid, remained behind him. Soon after, Busch became the leader of the race and would maintain a total of 218 laps in first place. After the final caution, Busch led on the restart, but McMurray passed him. McMurray held the lead through the end of the race, becoming the first driver not in the 2010 Chase to win a race during the Chase.

There were nine cautions and 27 lead changes among 19 different drivers throughout the course of the race. It was McMurray's third win in the 2010 season, and the sixth of his career. The result moved him up to 13th in the Drivers' Championship, 75 points ahead Ryan Newman in 14th. Chevrolet maintained its lead in the Manufacturers' Championship, 45 ahead of Toyota and 85 ahead of Ford, with five races remaining in the season. A total of 103,000 people attended the race, while 5.345 million watched it on television.

Report

Background 

Charlotte Motor Speedway is one of ten intermediate tracks to hold NASCAR races; the others are Atlanta Motor Speedway, Kansas Speedway, Chicagoland Speedway, Darlington Raceway, Homestead Miami Speedway, New Hampshire Motor Speedway, Kentucky Speedway, Las Vegas Motor Speedway, and Texas Motor Speedway. The track's turns are banked at twenty-four degrees, while the front stretch, the location of the finish line, is five degrees. The back stretch also has a five degree banking. The racetrack has seats for 140,000 spectators.

Before the race, Jimmie Johnson led the Drivers' Championship with 5,673 points, and Denny Hamlin stood in second with 5,637 points. Kevin Harvick followed in third with 5,619 points, thirty-one ahead of Jeff Gordon and fifty-one ahead of Tony Stewart in fourth and fifth respectively. With 5,533 points, Kurt Busch was in sixth, twenty-two points ahead of Carl Edwards, as Jeff Burton with 5,496 points, was thirteen ahead of Kyle Busch, and forty-one in front of Greg Biffle who rounded out the top ten. Matt Kenseth and Clint Bowyer were eleventh and twelfth with 5,432 and 5,426 respective points. In the Manufacturers' Championship, Chevrolet was leading with 220 points, forty-one points ahead of their rival Toyota. Ford, with 141 points, was twenty-two points ahead of Dodge in the battle for third. Johnson was the race's defending champion.

Practice and qualifying 

Three practice sessions were held before the Saturday race—one on Thursday, and two on Friday. The first session lasted 90 minutes, while the second session lasted 45 minutes. The final session lasted 65 minutes. During the first practice session, Stewart-Haas Racing's Ryan Newman was fastest ahead of Joey Logano and Kyle Busch in second and third respectively. Mark Martin placed fourth, and David Reutimann finished fifth. Stewart, Reed Sorenson, Scott Speed, David Ragan, and Juan Pablo Montoya rounded out the top ten fastest drivers in the session.

Forty-nine cars were entered for qualifying, but only forty-three were allowed to race due to NASCAR's qualifying procedure. Gordon clinched his 69th career pole position with a time of 28.192 seconds. He was joined on the front row of the grid by Edwards. A. J. Allmendinger qualified third, Martin took fourth, and Paul Menard started fifth. The six drivers that failed to qualify for the race were Joe Nemechek, Casey Mears, Mike Bliss, Jason Leffler, Kevin Conway and Johnny Sauter. Once the qualifying session completed, Gordon commented, "We used to qualify so well here, but competition and cars and different things changing over the years, we just sort of lost our way here, and I'll be honest, [Thursday], the way it was going, I didn't think we had any shot at this pole."

On the next evening, Kasey Kahne was quickest in the second practice session, ahead of Reutimann and Biffle in second and third. Kurt Busch was fourth quickest, and Martin Truex Jr. took fifth. Brad Keselowski, Allmendinger, Newman, Logano, and Ragan followed in the top-ten. Other drivers in the chase, such as Johnson, was fifteenth, and Harvick, who was twentieth. During the final practice session, Edwards was fastest with a time of 29.031. Sorenson and Kurt Busch followed in second and third with times of 29.133 and 29.135 seconds. Kahne managed to be fourth fastest, ahead of Jamie McMurray and Kyle Busch. Speed was scored seventh, Menard took eighth, Truex was ninth, and Biffle took tenth.

Race 
The race, the thirty-first out of a total of thirty-six in the season, began at 7:30 p.m. EDT and was televised live in the United States on ABC. Car owner Joe Gibbs began pre-race ceremonies by giving the invocation. Next, Big Machine Records recording artist Danielle Peck performed the national anthem, and NASCAR Hall of Fame inductees gave the command for drivers to start their engines.

Gordon accelerated faster than Edwards off the line, getting ahead of him down the front straightaway. On the following lap, Newman spun sideways and collided into the wall, prompting the first caution to be given. Gordon initially maintained the lead on the restart, though Edwards passed him at the end of the eighth lap. Kyle Busch and Gordon both passed Edwards one lap later. On lap 11, Menard moved to third, as Newman drove to the garage for repairs. Four laps later, Menard took over second, after passing Gordon. After starting tenth, Johnson was scored in fifteenth on the nineteenth lap. On lap 24, the second caution was given because Kurt Busch spun sideways. All the front runners made pit stops during the caution. Gordon was the leader during the restart, as Joey Logano moved to second.

On the following lap, Kyle Busch moved into the first position. The third caution came out on lap 33, after Johnson spun sideways. On the restart, Kyle Busch was first, ahead of Gordon and Logano. After being involved in the first caution, Newman remained in the garage forty laps later. Hamlin, who started twenty-third on the grid, had moved to eleventh by lap 45. By lap 48, Kyle Busch had a 1.9 second lead over Gordon. Harvick had moved nineteen positions to fifth, after 55 laps. On the following lap, Johnson took over twenty-eighth, after spinning on lap 33, as Hamlin claimed the ninth position. On lap 61, Jeff Burton moved to seventh while Travis Kvapil went a lap down to the front runners. Afterward, Burton moved to fifth after passing Menard. The second round of pit stops began on lap 75, when Stewart and Harvick made pit stops. Gordon and Kyle Busch made pit stops two laps later, resulting in Juan Pablo Montoya receiving the lead.

Once Montoya made his pit stop, Kenseth became the leader, but after one lap he chose to make a pit stop, giving the lead to Patrick Carpentier. Carpentier made a pit stop on lap 84, which resulted in Kyle Busch reclaiming the lead. Kyle Busch had a 3.6 second lead by lap 87. Five laps later, Menard took over the seventh position, after passing Harvick. Then, on lap 95, Kyle Busch reported his throttle was sticking. To fix this problem, Busch used the cut-off switch (a switch on the back of the steering wheel to slow the car). Four laps later, Menard fell to the eighth position. On the following lap, Regan Smith was passed by Kyle Busch, putting him a lap behind. Busch reported to his crew that his throttle was improving on lap 105. On the following lap, debris caused the fourth caution. All the front runners made pit stops during the caution, and Johnson reported to his crew that he and Bowyer had collided on pit road. Kyle Busch led the drivers on the restart, ahead of Gordon, Montoya, Biffle, and Logano. One lap later, Biffle moved to second, as Hamlin claimed fifth.

On lap 119, Speed went a lap down after being passed by Busch. The fifth caution was given four laps later because Kahne spun sideways and collided into Sam Hornish Jr., which resulted in the two colliding with the wall. Some front runners made pit stops during the caution. On the restart, Martin was the leader, ahead Truex, McMurray, Montoya, and Johnson. On the following lap, McMurray took over second, as Johnson and Kyle Busch moved past Montoya. Afterward, Hamlin passed Gordon for the eighth position, as McMurray became the leader. By lap 144, McMurray had a 1.25 second lead over Martin. After 146 laps, Newman remained in the garage for repairs. Six laps later, Johnson claimed third, as Hamlin took over the fifth position. On lap 168, Johnson, McMurray, and Martin made their pit stops, seven laps ahead of Kyle Busch.

Once pit stops concluded, Jamie McMurray was the leader. Johnson took over the second position on lap 180. After passing Gordon two laps later, Allmendinger moved to the tenth position. Johnson became the leader on lap 189 after passing McMurray. On the following lap, Gordon's car lost power, which resulted in him making unscheduled pit stop. By the 195th lap, Johnson had a 1.36 second lead over the other drivers, though Kyle Busch began to catch Johnson shortly thereafter. On lap 203, the sixth caution was given because Marcos Ambrose spun near pit road. All the front runners made pit stops during the caution. During the pit stops, Kyle Busch became the leader, after passing Johnson on pit road. On the restart, Busch was first, while Johnson fell to fifth. Hamlin took over the fifth position from Johnson. Afterward, Gordon reported that he had alternator problems on lap 211. Four laps later, Johnson moved to fifth, as McMurray maintained the second position.

By lap 221, Kyle Busch had a 1.30 second lead over McMurray. Hamlin moved to third five laps later. On lap 239, Robby Gordon spun sideways, prompting the seventh caution to be given. During the caution, the front runners made pit stops, which resulted in Busch maintaining the lead ahead of Hamlin, McMurray, Johnson, and Biffle on the restart. On the following lap, Johnson moved to second. On lap 246, Burton spun sideways, after colliding with Bowyer. Burton was the only one to pit during the caution. Afterward, Kyle Busch led Johnson on lap 250. Five laps later, Harvick passed Truex for the seventh position. On lap 261, Logano passed Martin for tenth, as Kenseth moved into eighth. By lap 262, Busch had a 0.74 second lead over Johnson. Six laps later, Speed moved into twelfth, after passing Edwards. Busch expanded his lead to 2.01 seconds by lap 278. Six laps later, McMurray took over the second position from Johnson.

Once Kahne's race car was repaired, J. J. Yeley was put in his car to finish the race for the team, after Kahne became ill. On lap 289, the final pit stop set began. Busch and Johnson made pit stops on lap 294, one lap earlier than McMurray. During the pit stop cycle, Montoya, Sorenson, and Allmendinger briefly held the lead. While on pit road, Gordon received a pass-through penalty for speeding. On lap 299, Kyle Busch became the leader, as pit stops concluded. Three laps later, his lead shrunk to 1.3 seconds. On lap 308, the caution was given because of debris on the track. On the restart Busch led ahead of McMurray, Johnson, and Hamlin. On the following lap, McMurray became the leader. By lap 320, McMurray had a 1.02 second lead over Busch, as a battle for second place began between Busch and Johnson. McMurray crossed the finish line on lap 334 to take his third win of the season, two seconds ahead of Busch, who led the most laps (218). Johnson was third, ahead of Hamlin, Biffle, Kenseth, Logano, Harvick, Reutimann, and Ragan, who rounded out the top ten.

Post-race 

McMurray appeared in victory lane to celebrate his sixth win of the season in front of 103,000 people who attended the race. McMurray also earned $266,129 in race winnings, and later stated that his car performed best towards the end of the race: "We had a better car than Kyle at the end. He was better at certain stages during the race but at the end of the race, we had the best car."

Busch was rather disappointed with his second-place run: "Jamie got a good restart. I don't know if he got pushed from Jimmie or not, but he had a good run, good momentum getting into Turn 1. Then I got there and my car pushed up the race track ... and he was already gone. There was nothing I could do. I couldn't even stay to his outside. His car turned better than mine. Mine plowed right up the race track and he went right by me. ... It's very, very frustrating. I gave it all I had, but McMurray was better than me." After finishing fourth, Hamlin remained optimistic about his chances in his championship battle with Johnson: "He's a champion, and I'm not. ... He's figured this stuff out, and he's got a great team, as well as we do, but I haven't hit the 'go' button yet, and I feel like there's still more left with our team. I'm minimizing my risk right now, and I feel like, if I'm going to have a shot to win this thing when we get to Homestead [the season finale], I've got to minimize those risks."

The race result left Johnson leading the Drivers' Championship with 5,843 points. He was followed by Hamlin, who remained 41 points behind Johnson, though 36 and 115 points ahead of Harvick and Jeff Gordon respectively. Kyle Busch and Stewart were tied for fifth with 5,666 points, followed by Edwards, Biffle, Kurt Busch, and Burton in seventh through tenth. Kenseth and Bowyer were scored 11th and 12th with 5,587 and 5,543 points respectively. In the Manufacturers' Championship, Chevrolet maintained the lead with 230 points. Toyota held second with 185 points, 40 ahead of Ford and 63 ahead of Dodge. 5.345 million people watched the race on television.

Results

Qualifying

Race results

Standings after the race 

Note: Only the top twelve positions are included for the driver standings. These drivers qualified for the Chase for the Sprint Cup.

References 

Bank of America 500
Bank of America 500
NASCAR races at Charlotte Motor Speedway